Henson Creek is a stream in Hinsdale County, Colorado, United States. It rises near Sunshine Mountain in the San Juan Mountains. It merges with Lake Fork Gunnison River in the town of Lake City.

North Fork Henson Creek
North Fork Henson Creek joins Henson Creek near Capitol City, Colorado. From there, Henson Creek flows generally eastward and parallels Hinsdale County Road 20, here part of the Alpine Loop National Back Country Byway. It flows through Henson, Colorado, now a ghost town and the location of the abandoned Ute-Ulay Mine.

Abandoned dam

An old hydroelectric dam (38.020972 N, 107.378837 W) that supplied power for the mine lies on the creek at the Ute-Ulay mine site. Called the Hidden Treasure Dam, it burst in 1973 causing flooding and pollution downstream. The dam still stands and is visible from the road, but with a big hole in it.

See also

List of rivers of Colorado
List of tributaries of the Colorado River

References

External links

Rivers of Colorado
Rivers of Hinsdale County, Colorado
Tributaries of the Colorado River in Colorado